There were over 140 Empire ships that had a suffix beginning with S. They can be found at:-

 List of Empire ships - Sa to Sh
 List of Empire ships - Si to Sy.

For other Empire ships, see

 

Lists of Empire ships